Piseco is a small community in the town of Arietta in Hamilton County, New York, United States. The name "Piseco" is that of a Native American known to an early surveyor. Located in the heart of the Adirondacks, the hamlet is home to Piseco Lake and Piseco Airport. The Northville–Placid Trail runs close to Piseco Lake and the airport.

Hamlets in New York (state)
Hamlets in Hamilton County, New York